is a fantasy artist influenced by both the Surrealism and Impressionism movements. He created reference and background art for the Studio Ghibli film Whisper of the Heart and also provided a cameo appearance as the voice of Minami. More recently, his works were given a more direct adaptation in the short film  which is shown exclusively at the Ghibli Museum. He directed the 2007 OVA Iblard Jikan, produced by Studio Ghibli.

Inoue is currently a professor at Seian University of Art and Design.

He attended the Kanazawa College of Art from 1971 to 1973.

References

External links
Welcome to Iblard (in Japanese, English, Chinese, and French)
Naohisa Inoue at Nausicaa.net
Gallery
Polar Bear Gallery, Singapore @ http://www.contemporaryart.com.sg

1948 births
Japanese speculative fiction artists
Fantasy artists
Japanese painters
Living people
People from Ibaraki, Osaka
Studio Ghibli people
Japanese surrealist artists